Albert Costa was the 2-time defending champion, but lost in the third round to Francisco Clavet.

Àlex Corretja won the title after Emilio Benfele Álvarez was forced to retire due to an injury. The score was 6–3, 6–1, 3–0.

Seeds
All seeds received a bye to the second round.

Draw

Finals

Top half

Section 1

Section 2

Bottom half

Section 3

Section 4

References

External links
 Official results archive (ATP)
 Official results archive (ITF)

Austrian Open Kitzbühel
2000 ATP Tour